Sunil Kothari (20 December 1933 – 27 December 2020) was a noted Indian dance historian, scholar and critic. He was also former Uday Shankar Professor at Ravindra Bharti University, Kolkata.

Career 
He completed M. A. in 1964 and PhD in 1977. Professionally, Sunil Kothari was a chartered accountant.  He started his career with The Times of India. He also taught at Sydenham College of Commerce and Economics. He freelanced as a writer. He lived in Asian Games Village in Delhi.

Death 
He died on 27 December 2020 due to a cardiac arrest caused by COVID-19 complications.

Awards
He received Padma Shri award in 2001. He also received Sangeet Natak Akademi award in 1995 for overall contribution to the Indian classical dance. He was awarded Kumar Chandrak in 1961 and Ranjitram Suvarna Chandrak in 2012.

Bibliography
He has written 12 books on different forms of Indian classical dance and allied art-forms.

 Bharata Natyam: Indian Classical Dance Art
 Odissi: Indian Classical Dance Art
 Rasa: The Indian Performing Arts in the Last 25 Years
 Kuchipudi: Indian Classical Dance Art
 Photo Biography of Rukmini Devi
 Kathak: Indian Classical Dance Art
 New Directions In Indian Dance
 Chhau Dances of India
 Damaru: Essays on Classical Dance, Music, Performing Arts, Folk Dances, Rituals, Crafts

References

External links
 Sunil Kothari website 
 Article by Sunil Kothari 

Bharatanatyam exponents
Recipients of the Padma Shri in arts
Recipients of the Sangeet Natak Akademi Award
Dance critics
Indian art critics
Scholars from Delhi
Dance historians
1933 births
2020 deaths
Dance writers
Indian male writers
Indian art historians
20th-century Indian historians
20th-century Indian dancers
Recipients of the Ranjitram Suvarna Chandrak
Deaths from the COVID-19 pandemic in India
Recipients of the Sangeet Natak Akademi Fellowship